Two ships of the Royal Australian Navy have been named HMAS Larrakia, after the Larrakia Aborigines:

HMAS Larrakia, an air-sea rescue and patrol vessel operated during World War II
, an Armidale-class patrol boat commissioned in 2006 and operational as of 2016

Battle honours
Ships named HMAS Larrakia are entitled to carry a single battle honour:
Darwin 1942–43

References

Larrakia, HMAS